Hi Summer was a British television variety show made by London Weekend Television and shown on UK television in 1977 by ITV, the oldest commercial network in the UK. A total of eight episodes were made and featured a cast that included Leslie Crowther, Lena Zavaroni, Carl Wayne, Pearly Gates, Anna Dawson, Derek Griffiths, Chris Quinten and Stephanie Lawrence. This travelling variety show featured sketches, topical comedy and musical numbers that were recorded both in studio and on location (Stratford upon Avon, Crystal Palace, Knebworth House among others). The theme tune was composed by Lynsey de Paul, and sung by Carl Wayne and was released as a single. De Paul's  theme was later re-used on commercials for TVTimes.

References

External links
 

1977 British television series debuts
1977 British television series endings
1970s British television series
London Weekend Television shows
British variety television shows
Television series by ITV Studios
English-language television shows